Bernarr "Bill" Notley (31 August 1918 – 22 January 2019) was an English cricketer.  He was a right-handed batsman who bowled right-arm off break. 

Notley made a single first-class appearance for Nottinghamshire against Surrey at The Oval in the 1949 County Championship.  Surrey won the toss and elected to bat first, making 491/6 declared, with Notley taking the wicket of David Fletcher to finish with figures of 1/90 from 28 overs.  In response, Nottinghamshire made 213/8 in their first innings, during which Notley was dismissed for a duck by Alec Bedser.  No play was possible on the final day of the game, with a draw the end result.  

Notley was a regular member of the Nottinghamshire Second XI from 1949 to 1955. His selection for his only first-class match followed his performance in a Second XI match a few days earlier when he took 9 for 86 and 5 for 53 against Warwickshire Second XI. 

He worked for the Nottinghamshire County Council, where he was Deputy Director of Social Services before he retired.

See also
 Lists of oldest cricketers
 List of centenarians (sportspeople)

References

External links

Bernarr Notley at ESPNcricinfo
Bernarr Notley at CricketArchive

1918 births
2019 deaths
People from Mapperley
Cricketers from Nottinghamshire
English cricketers
Nottinghamshire cricketers
English centenarians
Men centenarians